Marian College is an independent Roman Catholic co-educational secondary day school located in Ararat, Victoria, Australia. 

Established in 1955, Marian College works under the governance of the Brigidine Sisters.

History
Marian College was founded in 1888 by the Brigidine Sisters from Ireland. The foundress being Mother Gertrude Kelly. It follows the five Brigidine Core Values and is under the motto "Fortiter et Suaviter" - Strength and Gentleness. The first teachers of the school were five Brigidine nuns from Ireland sent by Bishop Daniel Delany to Australia. The sisters came on the boat "The Ormuz" and moved into the new brick convent. The original convent is still in use in the school today housing the chapel, parlour, hall, offices, library and staff area.

The parlour, the most beautiful room in the school, was painted by Sister Kate Griffin, for whom a wing in the school is named.

There are numerous wings in the school named after influential people:
 Ursula Hayes Wing
 Brendan Davey Wing

See also 

 Catholic education in Australia
 List of high schools in Victoria
 List of non-government schools in Victoria

References

External links
 Marian College website

Ararat, Victoria
Educational institutions established in 1888
Catholic secondary schools in Victoria (Australia)
1888 establishments in Australia
Brigidine schools
Roman Catholic Diocese of Ballarat